The Six Mile Run Reformed Church is in the Six Mile Run section of Franklin Township, Somerset County, New Jersey. It takes its name from Six Mile Run, a tributary of the Millstone River that flows through the area.

History
The congregation met at the Church of the Three Mile Run, which was built in 1703.

As the congregation grew, new churches were split off with a portion of the congregation. The Six Mile Run congregation emerged in 1710.

In 1720, Reverend Theodorus Jacobus Frelinghuysen became the permanent pastor. He was sent from Holland to take charge of the Dutch churches of Middlesex, Somerset, and Hunterdon counties.

The first building on the present site was built in 1745.

The first building was replaced by a new building in 1766 and was later replaced in 1817 by a third structure on the same site. The current building replaced the 1817 church that was destroyed by fire on January 7, 1879. Within a year the current building was erected and dedicated.

The Frelinghuysen Memorial Chapel was added in 1907. Electricity was installed in 1926. In 1958  Fellowship Hall was dedicated  and the Frelinghuysen Memorial Chapel was renovated.

Pastors
1983, H. Eugene Speckman.
1720, Theodorus Jacobus Frelinghuysen. He was the first pastor of the Six Mile Run Reformed Church.
Johannes Arondeus

References

Franklin Township, Somerset County, New Jersey
Churches on the National Register of Historic Places in New Jersey
Churches completed in 1879
Churches in Somerset County, New Jersey
National Register of Historic Places in Somerset County, New Jersey
New Jersey Register of Historic Places
Reformed Church in America churches in New Jersey
1690 establishments in New Jersey